Suraj Singh (born 25 January 1999) is a New Zealand freestyle wrestler.

Biography
Singh was born in Tauranga on 25 January 1999. He started wrestling when he was 11 years old, and wrestles for the Katikati Wildcats club in Katikati.

At the 2019 Oceania Wrestling Championships, Singh won two gold medals. He represented his county in the men's freestyle 57 kg event at the 2022 Commonwealth Games, where lost his bronze medal match against Pakistani athlete Ali Asad, but was subsequently awarded the bronze medal after Asad was disqualified for a doping violation.

References 

1999 births
Living people
Sportspeople from Tauranga
New Zealand male sport wrestlers
Commonwealth Games medallists in wrestling
Commonwealth Games bronze medallists for New Zealand
Wrestlers at the 2022 Commonwealth Games
Medallists at the 2022 Commonwealth Games